Presbyterian School is a private, coeducational Christian PreK-8 day school in the Museum District, Houston. Presbyterian School is composed of three divisions: an Early Childhood division,  Alpha through Pre-kindergarten, a Lower School division, Kindergarten through grade four, and a Middle School division, fifth through eighth grade.

The School shares a campus with First Presbyterian Church but is governed by an independent Board of Trustees and maintains an independent 501(c)(3) non-profit corporation status.   The School is financially independent from First Presbyterian Church.

History
In 1986, Dr. John William Lancaster appointed a School Study Committee to explore the feasibility of an Early Childhood and Lower School at the church. Presbyterian School was officially founded in 1988 and opened its doors in the Fall of 1989. The original goal was to starting with those kindergarten age and younger and add an additional grade each year thereafter.

In August 2000, the school expanded with its addition of a middle school and accepted its first class of fifth and sixth graders.  Presbyterian graduated its first class of eighth grade students in 2003. That year, Ray Johnson, formerly the principal of All Saints School in Tyler, Texas, became the principal at Presbyterian.

As of that year it had 490 students.

Memberships and accreditations
 Independent Schools Association of the Southwest (ISAS)
 National Association of Independent Schools (NAIS) Council for Advancement and Support of Education (CASE)
 Council for Spiritual and Ethical Education (CSEE)
 Educational Records Bureau (ERB)
 Elementary School Heads' Association (ESHA)
 Houston Association of Independent Schools (HAIS)
 Independent School Management (ISM) 
 School Office Services (SOS)

Campus
Presbyterian School is located in the First Presbyterian Church of Houston.  Presbyterian School counts among its neighbors institutions of learning and the arts such as Rice University, The Museum of Natural Science, Houston's Medical Center, The Houston Children's Museum, The Museum of Fine Arts and St. Thomas University. The main campus includes two learning commons, four science labs, two art rooms (including in-house kiln), two music rooms, an Academic Enrichment Center, two gymnasiums, a 1200-seat theatre, sanctuary and chapel. Presbyterian School enrolls more than 490 children from age 2 through eighth grade.

Presbyterian School has expanded its campus to include a 14-acre Outdoor Education Campus (OEC) less than five miles from the school. The outdoor campus is located just south of the Texas Medical Center on Highway 288 (9100 South Freeway) and is easily accessible by school bus. The Outdoor Education Campus provides space for environmental learning, sports and athletics, nature trails, play areas and outdoor worship.

Academics
Early Childhood students explore ideas and develop skills through art, music and movement, dramatic play, blocks, language arts, social studies, and math. Field trips, interactive science experiments, and readiness activities in reading and math further enhance the program.

Lower School students are taught Language Arts, Everyday Mathematics, and Social Studies in their primary classroom.  Faculty with specialized training in Science, Art, Chapel, Library, Music, Physical Education, and Spanish provide instruction beyond the walls of a student's homeroom and in interdisciplinary activities.

Middle School students are required to take five core classes including English, History, Mathematics, Science and Spanish. Rotation classes are also required for students in each grade. In fifth and sixth grade those include Art, Religion, Music, and Study Skills.  In seventh and eighth grade those include Wellness electives (Life Skills, Bible, Health, PE, and Biomechanics) and Fine Arts electives (Drama, Music, Art, and Photography).  Seventh and eighth grade students take an exam at the end of the second and fourth quarters.

Extracurricular activities
Students are encouraged to participate in activities that benefit the community through an annual day of service. Local organizations that have benefited from volunteer efforts include Child Advocates, Emergency Aid Coalition, Houston Food Bank, Main Street Ministries, Nehemiah Center, St. Andrew's School and St. Paul's School.

Athletics

Fall sports
 Cross Country
 Field Hockey
 Football
 Volleyball

Winter sports
 Basketball
 Soccer
 Swimming
 Wrestling

Spring sports
 Conditioning
 Golf
 Lacrosse
 Track & Field
 Baseball

See also
 Christianity in Houston
 Christian school

References

External links

 Presbyterian School

Christian schools in Houston
Private K–8 schools in Houston
Independent Schools Association of the Southwest
Presbyterian schools in the United States
Educational institutions established in 1988
1988 establishments in Texas